Where Did I Go Right? is English singer-songwriter John Otway's first solo album. Released in 1979 it was Otway's first departure from working with Wild Willy Barrett, and his first working with a different backing band. Most of the tracks were salvaged from an aborted attempt to record an album during August and September 1978 at Mountain Studios.

Critical reception
Trouser Press praised the "poignant" "Frightened and Scared."

Track listing

Personnel
John Otway - vocals, guitar
Maggie Ryder - backing vocals
Paul Martinez - bass
Charlie Morgan - drums
Julian Smedley - fiddle
Ollie Halsall - guitar
Morgan Fisher - keyboards
Technical
Neil Innes - producer
John Altman - arrangements
Steve James - engineering, production
Nick Thomas - assistant engineer

References

External links

1979 debut albums
Polydor Records albums
John Otway albums